Amata phoenicia is a moth of the family Erebidae. It was described by George Hampson in 1898. It is found in Kenya and Tanzania.

References

 

phoenicia
Moths described in 1898
Moths of Africa